Michael W. Campbell (born 1978) is a Seventh-day Adventist historian, theologian, pastor, and educator.  In 2022 he was appointed director of archives, statistics, and research at the North American Division of Seventh-day Adventists.

Biography 
Campbell completed a BA at Southern Adventist University, an MA from Andrews University, and in 2008 a PhD from Andrews University. Campbell was ordained as a Seventh-day Adventist minister in 2008 and spent five years in pastoral ministry in Colorado and Kansas. He is the assistant editor of The Ellen G. White Encyclopedia. In 2007 he was one of the organizers of the 50th anniversary conference at Andrews University on Questions on Doctrine. He formerly served as professor of religion at Southwestern Adventist University and before that as professor of church  history at the Adventist International Institute of Advanced Studies. He formerly edited the Journal of Asia Adventist Studies, a peer-reviewed academic journal.

Research 
Campbell's doctoral dissertation focused on the 1919 Bible Conference. He argues that it was a germinal event in understanding Seventh-day Adventist theology after the death of Adventist prophetess Ellen G. White. Arthur Patrick states that his research helps "push back the horizons of Adventist understanding."

Books published 
2022. 1922: The Rise of Adventist Fundamentalism
2020. The Pocket Dictionary for Understanding Adventism
2019. 1919: The Untold Story of Adventism's Struggle with Fundamentalism
2018. The Ellen G. White Pocket Dictionary (with Jud Lake)
2017. Here We Stand: Luther, the Reformation, and Seventh-day Adventism (co-editor)
2013. Discovering Ellen G. White
2013. Discovering Our Adventist Past

See also

 History of the Seventh-day Adventist Church
 Seventh-day Adventist Church
 Questions on Doctrine

References

External links
 
 Adventist International Institute of Advanced Studies profile
 Seventh-day Adventist Periodical Index (SDAPI) search for articles by Campbell

Southern Adventist University alumni
Seventh-day Adventist religious workers
Protestant writers
1978 births
Living people
American Seventh-day Adventists
Andrews University alumni